Ferries within Wellington's harbour carry commuters and tourists on Wellington Harbour and form a part of the Wellington public transport system. They operate between central Wellington, Days Bay (near Eastbourne), Seatoun, and Matiu/Somes Island. Until 2016, services also ran to Petone on weekends. Historically they also served Lowry Bay and Rona Bay—the ferries belonged to the Eastbourne Borough Council from 1913 to 1950—and briefly, until 1913, Miramar and Karaka Bay. The development of road connections around the harbour's edge, particularly once they were paved during the 1920s, reduced the importance of ferries to the city's transport network, but regular services still run. 

Some of the most notable vessels were the SS Cobar and SS Duchess. Cobar was the longest serving, 42 years from 1906 to 1948 when all services ended because Cobar was badly damaged by fire. Duchess was specially built for Port Nicholson in 1897 but licensed to carry 1,029 against Cobars 745 passengers she had to be first to go when commuters switched to the buses in the 1920s. She was laid up by the council in 1929 and sold in 1930.

Routes
A ferry service to Days Bay began in 1893 and later served Eastbourne (at Rona Bay). The service was taken over by the Eastbourne Borough Council in 1913 and continued to operate until 1948.

In 1989, a new ferry service was established to Days Bay. It is the only commuter ferry in operation in Wellington. It is run by the private company East by West, with a subsidy from local authorities.

Ferry services from central Wellington to Miramar, Seatoun and Karaka Bay began in 1901. There were several runs each day, operated by a private company, Wellington Harbour Ferries. A second company, the Miramar Ferry Company, began operations the following year, but was bought out by Wellington Harbour Ferries in 1906. Improvements to road connections, notably the construction of the Seatoun Tunnel, made road journeys substantially quicker and easier, and caused patronage to drop—regular services ceased in 1913. In 2006, weekend services to Seatoun resumed followed in March 2008 by a commuter service.

Attempts have been made in recent years to establish a ferry service from central Wellington to Petone, on the northern coast of the harbour. Although there is a major road and rail corridor connecting Petone and Wellington, a ferry service might reduce congestion and possibly provide a faster journey. A trial commuter service was withdrawn in the mid-2000s after failing to attract the level of patronage expected, but Petone continued to be served by a weekend "Harbour Explorer" service until the wharf was damaged in the 2016 Kaikoura earthquake. The Hutt City Council planned in 2017 to spend  million on repairing the wharf. Both the East by West ferry company and the mayor of Lower Hutt, Ray Wallace, expressed interest in reintroducing a commuter service.

Although Matiu/Somes Island has never had a substantial population its establishment as a nature reserve generated demand for a ferry service. The island opened to the public in 1995 and off-peak and weekend ferries call on request.

Vessels
These vessels also carried Wellington Harbour Board's pilots and towed large vessels within the harbour.

Owners and operators of steamers

Captain WR Williams
William Robert Williams (1832–1890) was born at Gravesend, England 5 March 1832 and died at his house on Wellington's The Terrace on 17 March 1890. He started out to be a sailor at the age of 12 in vessels trading on the English coast. Moving to Australia in 1856 he involved himself in trade between Melbourne and ports in South Australia then became chief officer on a vessel running to Otago. He acquired an interest in the barque Anne Melhuish in which he brought coal to New Zealand from Newcastle taking timber, kauri gum, and, at the end of the Maori wars, troops the other way. The trans-Tasman coal trade was very profitable. He was soon able to purchase Heversham, Australind, Cyrus, Edwin Bassett, Carlotta, Neptune, Robin Hood, Sophia R Luhrs, G M Tucker, Ellerton, and Mary Bannatyne all forming the nucleus of the Black Diamond Line.

In 1876 he bought the steamer Grafton in Sydney and in 1881 while in England he bought the steamer Westport then being built in Glasgow. The following year, his only son, J. H. Williams, superintended the construction of steamers Koranui and Mawhera in Britain also for the West Coast trade. Other steam vessels belonging to the line were Moa, Manawatu, and Maitai.

Captain Williams moved into coal mining in 1885 forming a company to work a coal lease at Westport then adding the Koranui Coal Company and the Coal Pit Heath mine. However, in 1886, Williams disposed of them to Westport Coal Company and sold his vessels to Union Steam Ship Company (the "Southern Octopus"). He had intended to pay another visit to the Old Country but was found to be suffering from heart disease.

Described as a shrewd man of business he was at one time the largest employer of labour in Wellington. As well as running his line of steamers, he had his shipbuilding yard on the Te Aro foreshore, its site is now on the north side of Halley's Lane in lower Taranaki Street. For some years he was the government's nominee on the Wellington Harbour Board. His obituary in Wellington's Evening Post reported "Although occasionally brusque in his manner Captain Williams possessed a kindly disposition and his acts of benevolence were numerous."

JH Williams
James Herbert Williams (c. 1858–1915), the son of Captain WR Williams, was for many years connected with his father's business. The younger Williams subsequently acquired the local tug and ferry service which he conducted for a number of years. It eventually developed into the Wellington Steam Ferry Company which developed Day's Bay Estate into a popular resort. Williams died at Thorndon, on 19 January 1915. J. H. Williams held the piloting and tugboat contract at Wellington between 1894 and 1899 with the tugs Duco and Mana. In 1900 he sold his business including the resort of Days Bay to his Wellington Steam Ferry Company.

Wellington Steam Ferry Company
Incorporated 1900 (J. H. Williams, manager E. G. F. Zohrab). Williams sold his interest in 1905 to William Watson's syndicate and the company became a subsidiary of Watson's newly formed Wellington Harbour Ferries.

Miramar Ferry Company
Incorporated 1901, plant to Wellington Harbour Ferries in 1906.

Wellington Harbour Ferries
Incorporated 1906 by (Wm. Watson (1846–1938), president of the Bank of New Zealand, and other Seatoun residents, manager E. G. F. Zohrab) to own a controlling share of Wellington Steam Ferry Company and the plant from Miramar Ferry. In 1913, the ferries were sold to the Eastbourne Borough Council, Day's Bay House to Miss Sommerville, the remaining Day's Bay land was bought by Wellington City Council and the companies were eventually wound up.

E. G. F. Zohrab
Zohrab (1871–1933). When the council took over Duchess and Cobar in 1913 he took over Admiral, Karaka, and Pilot using them for towing and general work about the harbour but he  ran no ferry services, leaving Karaka Bay and Seatoun without any ferry service at all.

Eastbourne Borough Council
The council committed themselves to the purchase of two vessels on 26 June 1913 and took over Duchess and Cobar on 1 September 1913. The timetable was increased and the service made more convenient for East Harbour residents. In 1923 the council purchased Muritai but it proved an expensive vessel to run. The paving of the Hutt Road and the extension of the bitumen to Muritai lowered ferry custom and the council was obliged to buy a fleet of buses. Duchess was sold in 1934. Muritai was taken over for Defence purposes in August 1940. Cobar was badly damaged by fire in 1948 and sold for a trawler in 1950. Cobar replacement  Ocean Cruiser proved unreliable and did not attract the hoped-for custom.

References

External links

East by West Ferries

Public transport in the Wellington Region
Wellington City
Lower Hutt
Wellington Harbour